Garividi mandal is one of the mandals in Vizianagaram district of the Indian state of Andhra Pradesh.

Demography 
This Mandal had a population of 68,289 as of the 2011 Census, consisting of 34,217 males and 34,072 females. The average literacy rate is 97% for males and 90% for females, for a combined average of 94%. Garividi comes under Cheepurupalli Assembly Constituency and Vizianagaram Loksabha constituency.

Villages in garividi mandal 
1	Appannavalasa
2	Arthamuru
3	Avagudem
4	Baguvalasa
5	Bondapalle
6	Burravarigollala Palem
7	Chandapuram
8	Chukkavalasa
9	Devada
10	Dummeda
11	Gadabavalasa
12	Gaddapuvalasa

13	Gotnandi
14	Itamvalasa
15	
16	K. Palavalasa
17	Kapusambham
18	Konda Lakshmipuram
19	Kondadadi
20	Kondasambham
21	Konuru
22	Kumaram
23	Mandiravalasa
24	Mokhasaduggi Valasa
25	Neeladripuram @ Surammapeta
26	Regatiagraharam
27	Seripeta
28	Sivaram
29	Sriramnagar (CT)
30	Thatiguda
31	Thondrangi
32	Vedullavalasa
33	Venkupatrunirega
34	Vijayarampuram (Near) Kumaram
35	Yenuguvalasa
36  -Kandipeta
37-Duvvam

References 

Mandals in Vizianagaram district